Myebon ( Myebon Township) is a town of Mrauk-U District in Rakhine State, Myanmar (Burma). In the 2014 census, the population of the Town is 137,193.

References

External links
Satellite map at Maplandia.com

Populated places in Rakhine State
Township capitals of Myanmar